Brian "Billy" Melrose (born 9 May 1963) is an Australian professional rugby union coach and former player who played as a fly-half and inside centre. He was head coach of the Greater Sydney Rams for the inaugural season of Australia's National Rugby Championship in 2014.

Family and early life
Brian Melrose grew up in Baulkham Hills in Sydney, as the third of four brothers who all played first-grade rugby. His brother Tony Melrose is a former Wallaby who also played rugby league for Parramatta, Souths, Easts, Manly and New South Wales.

Rugby career
Melrose played as a fly-half or centre in Sydney's club rugby competition for Parramatta, Western Suburbs (now West Harbour), and Eastwood in the 1980s and 1990s. He won the A.L. Vincent Trophy for the best and fairest player at Western Suburbs in 1994. Melrose played 240 first-grade games between 1982 and 1999, returning to his first club Parramtta as first-grade captain-coach before retiring.

Coaching career
Melrose was appointed as co-coach of the previously struggling West Harbour club in 2001, and achieved an immediate improvement with the team reaching the play-offs in both 2001 and 2002. He was named as the NSW Premier Rugby 'Coach of the Year' in 2002. Melrose was recruited by Manly RUFC as Head Coach for the 2003 season, and again improved his team's position (from 10th in 2002) to reach the play-offs in 2003 and 2004.

He undertook a coaching study tour of the UK before joining the New South Wales Waratahs as attack and kicking coach for the 2005 season. It was the Waratahs' most successful Super Rugby season, making the grand final for the first time and following that up with another finals appearance in 2006.

Melrose was appointed Head Coach of the Western Sydney Rams for the inaugural Australian Rugby Championship in 2007. With the youngest team in Australia, the Rams were tipped to finish in the bottom two on the ladder but instead claimed the minor premiership with a thrilling brand of rugby under Melrose.

He was Head Coach of the Australia under 20s team which finished in fifth place at the 2008 IRB Junior World Championships, and Head Coach of Eastwood in 2009.

Melrose left for Ireland in 2010 to take up a contract as assistant coach with Connacht in the Pro12 competition. He was recruited to London Irish in 2011. Returning to Australia in 2013, he worked on his building business and worked with NRL club St George-Illawarra as a skills coach.

The Greater Sydney Rams appointed Melrose as Head Coach for the 2014 season, renewing their association with the coach that took the Western Sydney Rams to the Minor Premiership in 2007.

References

Living people
Australian rugby union coaches
Australian rugby union players
Connacht Rugby non-playing staff
Rugby union centres
Rugby union fly-halves
1963 births